Heroini is a fish tribe from the Cichlasomatinae subfamily in the cichlid family. All cichlids native to the Greater Antilles, United States (southern Texas), Mexico and northern Central America are members of this tribe. It also includes most cichlid species in southern Central America (where only non-Heroini cichlids are Andinoacara and Geophagus) and several species from South America (where several other tribes exist). A large percentage of its species were formerly placed in the genus Cichlasoma (itself now placed in the tribe Cichlasomatini), but have since been moved to other genera.

In other classifications the tribe Heroini is placed in the subfamily Cichlinae.

Genera
This tribe include about 35 genus and 160 species:
 Amatitlania Schmitter-Soto, 2007
 Amphilophus Agassiz, 1859
 Archocentrus Gill, 1877
 Astatheros Pellegrin, 1904
 Australoheros Říčan & Kullander, 2006
 Caquetaia Fowler, 1945
 Chiapaheros McMahan & Piller, 2015 
 Chocoheros Říčan & Piálek, 2016
 Chortiheros Říčan & Piálek, 2016
 Cincelichthys McMahan & Piller, 2015
 Chuco Fernández-Yépez, 1969
 Cryptoheros Allgayer, 2001
 Darienheros Říčan & Novák 2016
 Herichthys Baird & Girard, 1854
 Heroina Kullander, 1996
 Heros Heckel, 1840
 Herotilapia Pellegrin, 1904
 Hoplarchus Kaup, 1860
 Hypselecara Kullander, 1986
 Hypsophrys Agassiz, 1859
 Isthmoheros (Meek & Hildebrand, 1913) 
 Kihnichthys McMahan & Matamoros, 2015
 Kronoheros Říčan & Piálek, 2016
 Maskaheros McMahan & Piller, 2015
 Mayaheros Říčan & Piálek, 2016
 Mesoheros McMahan & Chakrabarty, 2015
 Mesonauta Günther, 1867
 Nandopsis Gill, 1862
 Nosferatu De la Maza-Benignos, Ornelas-García, Lozano-Vilano, García-Ramírez & Doadrio, 2015
 Oscura McMahan & Chakrabarty, 2015
 Panamius Schmitter-Soto, 2007
 Parachromis Agassiz, 1859
 Paraneetroplus Regan, 1905
 Petenia Günther, 1862
 Pterophyllum Heckel, 1840
 Rheoheros McMahan & Matamoros, 2015
 Rocio Schmitter-Soto, 2007
 Symphysodon Heckel, 1840
 Talamancaheros Říčan & Novák, 2016
 Theraps Günther, 1862
 Thorichthys Meek, 1904
 Tomocichla Regan, 1908
 Trichromis McMahan & Chakrabarty, 2015
 Uaru Heckel, 1840
 Vieja Fernández-Yépez, 1969
 Wajpamheros'' Říčan & Piálek, 2016

References

 
Fish tribes
Cichlid fish of Central America
Cichlid fish of South America